Rock Salt & Nails is the debut album by Steve Young. It is a pioneering Country rock/Outlaw country album that was recorded in 1969, with guest musicians Gram Parsons, Gene Clark and James Burton.

Track listing
All tracks composed by Steve Young; except where indicated
"That's How Strong My Love Is"  (Roosevelt Jamison)
"Rock Salt and Nails"  (Utah Phillips) 
"I'm a One-Woman Man"  (Johnny Horton, Tillman Franks)
"Coyote"  (Peter La Farge) 
"Gonna Find Me a Bluebird"  (Marvin Rainwater)
"Love in My Time"  
"Seven Bridges Road"  
"Kenny's Song"  (Kenny Austin) 
"Holler in the Swamp"  
"Hoboin'"  (Traditional; arranged by Steve Young) 
"My Sweet Love Ain't Around"  (Hank Williams)

Personnel
Steve Young – rhythm guitar, vocals
James Burton – dobro, guitar
Gram Parsons – organ, unverified guitar 
Gene Clark – harmonica on "My Sweet Love Ain't Around", unverified guitar
David Jackson – bass
Chris Ethridge – bass
Richard Greene – fiddle
Meyer Sniffin – fiddle on "Rock Salt & Nails" and "I'm a One Woman Man"
Don Beck – guitar
Hal Blaine – drums
Bernie Leadon – unverified guitar

Production
Producer: Tommy LiPuma
Recording Engineer: Dick Bogert
Art Direction: Tom Wilkes
Photography (front cover): Barry Feinstein
Photography (back cover): Jim McCrary
Liner notes: Jim McCrary, Steve Young
Strings arranged by: Bob Thompson
Recorded at A&M Studios, Hollywood

Steve Young (musician) albums
1969 debut albums
Albums arranged by Bob Thompson (musician)
Albums produced by Tommy LiPuma
A&M Records albums